Cossulus nasreddin is a moth in the family Cossidae. It is found in Uzbekistan.

The length of the forewings is about 16 mm. The forewings are light brown, with a pattern of ochraceous spots and stripes. The marginal border is brownish and the submarginal area is brown and almost fused to a dark-brown postdiscal band. The basal area of the wing is brownish. The hindwings are brown.

References

Natural History Museum Lepidoptera generic names catalog

Moths described in 2006
Cossinae
Moths of Asia